Sarı is the Turkish word for "yellow" or "blond". It may refer to:

Surname
 Adem Sarı (born 1985), Turkish footballer
 Ali Sarı (born 1986), Turkish taekwondo practitioner
 Hasan Ahmet Sarı (born 1992), Turkish footballer
 Hızır Sarı (born 1951), Turkish sports wrestler
 Sencer Sarı (born 1982), Turkish ceramicist
 Veysel Sarı (born 1988), Turkish footballer
 Yunus Sarı (born 1991), Turkish martial artist
 Yusuf Sari (born 1998), Turkish footballer
 Waddah Sari (1979), Actor, martial artist

Nickname
 Sari Saltik (died 1297/1298), semi-legendary Turkish dervish
 Sarı Süleyman Pasha (died 1687), Ottoman statesman of Bosnian origin

Other uses
 Battle of Sari Bair (1915), final battle of the Gallipoli campaign
 Sari Gelin, the name for a number of folk songs

See also
 Sari (disambiguation)

Turkish-language surnames